Escambray is a Cuban newspaper. It is published in Spanish, with an online English edition. The newspaper is located in Sancti Spiritus.

External links 
 Escambray online 
 Escambray online 

Mass media in Sancti Spíritus
Newspapers published in Cuba
Publications with year of establishment missing
Spanish-language newspapers